Unidad Editorial, S.A. is a Spanish media company. It owns the newspapers El Mundo, Expansión and Marca. It is primarily owned by the Italian holding RCS MediaGroup.

History

Grupo Recoletos was the publisher of the newspapers Marca, Expansión and the magazines Actualidad Económica and Telva. Unedisa was the publisher of El Mundo, founded in 1989 by Pedro J. Ramírez. Back in 2000, Veo Televisión (owned by Unedisa) had been also conceded one of the two new DTT licenses granted by People's Party government. 

Following the leaving of Pedro J. Ramírez from El Mundo in 2014, RCS MediaGroup asserted a tighter control over Unidad Editorial. In 2016, RCS MediaGroup was acquired in a takeover by Urbano Cairo, who had support from the Intesa Sanpaolo banking group.

Holdings

Newspapers
In 2006, the share of the newspapers controlled by the founding companies was 10% in the Spanish press market.

El Mundo
Expansión (business newspaper)
Marca (sports newspaper)
El Cronista (Buenos Aires)
Diario Información (Santiago, Chile)

Magazines
Actualidad Económica (business magazine)
NBA
Arte

Television 
Through Veo TV, Unidad Editorial has one of the DTT licenses in Spain, leased to third parties.

Radio
 (sports radio)

Ownership 
Italian media conglomerate RCS MediaGroup owns 96.48% of Unidad Editorial.

See also 
 Media in Spain

References
Citations

Bibliography

External links 

Spanish companies established in 2007
Mass media companies of Spain
Newspaper companies
Publishing companies of Spain
RCS MediaGroup